Carmen Schäfer (born 2 July 1971) is a German footballer. She played in three matches for the Germany women's national football team in 1997.

References

External links
 

1971 births
Living people
German women's footballers
Germany women's international footballers
Place of birth missing (living people)
Women's association footballers not categorized by position